This is a list of the material released by English indie rock band Captain.

Demo CDs / Early Tracks
"Build A Life"
"Western High"
"East West"
"Kennedy"
"Frontline"
"This Heart Keeps Beating For Me"
"Glorious"
"Broke"
"Earache"
"Why Wait"
"Hold Your Fire"
"Patience"
"The Egotist"

Albums

This Is Hazelville
"This is Hazelville cdr" album (EMI) no cat no
"This is Hazelville cdr" encoded album (rare)
"This Is Hazelville Box set album promo" UK CAT NO 00946 363764 2 4
"This Is Hazelville card sleeve promo" album UK CAT NO 00946 365269 2 8
"This Is Hazelville Taiwan release cd" With Obi Strip UK CAT NO 0094637085028
"This Is Hazelville cd uk release (EMI) 00946370 8502
"This Is Hazelville double gatefold vinyl ltd 2000 (EMI) UK CAT NO 00946 365 2691 1
"This Is Hazelville double gatefold vinyl TEST PRESSING/ACCITATE (no info)
"Captain Compilation" BMG Publishing cd given away to 500 at Edinburgh Festival album + 8 instrumentals

Distraction
"Distraction"  Promo CDR EMI Album (diff running order)
"Distraction"  Promo CDR EMI Album revised track order
"Distraction"  Promo CDR Metropolis mastering Album Sampler
"Distraction"  Promo CDR Metropolis mastering Alternate version
"Distraction"  Promo CDR EMI 207 9982 Album Sampler includes 6 tracks
"Distraction"  Promo CDR Universal Publishing Album Sampler (11 tracks) + 8 instrumental versions

Singles

"Frontline At Large" version
"Frontline 2 track promo CD" (At Large) FUGCDDJO11 CAT NO 00946 341830 2 4
"Frontline white label 7" 1 of 99 made !! (At Large) FUGODJ011
"Frontline 2 track commercial CD" (At Large) FUGCD011 CAT NO 00946 341832 2 2
"Frontline 2 Track commercial blue sparkle 7" (At Large) FUGO011 CAT NO 00946 341 8327 7

"Broke"
"Broke 1 track cdr" (emi) UK NO CAT
"Broke 2 track promo CD" inc instrumental CDEMDJ 689 00946 359698 2 5
"Broke white label 7" 1 of 99 EM689
"Broke CD wallet" for download
"Broke CD" 2 track commercial cd including "Why Wait" cdem689 CAT NO 00946 359 759 2 5
"Broke gatefold vinyl 7" (1)" commercial 7" including "Kennedy" EM 689 CAT NO 00946 359 6987 0
"Broke vinyl 7" (2)" commercial 7" 2 including "Falling down the stairs EMX689 CAT NO 00946 363 1967 4

"Glorious"
"Glorious 1 track cdr" (emi) NO CAT NO
"Glorious 2 track cdr" (emi) inc album version NO CAT NO
"Glorious 3 track promo cd" inc instrumental CDEMDJ 700 CAT NO 00946 369 382 2 6
"Glorious white label 7" CAT NO EM 700
"Glorious Radio Slave 12" white label 12 EM DJ 700
"Glorious GOLD box with cd" for downloads NO CAT NO
"Glorious international 3 track promo cd" with cat code starting DPRO
"Glorious Download cd" given away with box NO CAT NO
"Glorious 2 track cd" commercial cd1 includes "Spring Park Hotel" CDEM 700 CAT NO 00946 3700942 0
"Glorious 4 track maxi cd" commercial cd2 includes "An Evening Light, Radioslave mix and video" CDEMS 700 CAT NO 00946 370 0940 6
"Glorious gatefold 7" vinyl (1) EM 700 CAT NO 00946 370 094 7 5
"Glorious 5" VINYL test pressing no info?

"Frontline"
"Frontline 2 track promo cd" inc instrumental CDEMDJX 708 CAT NO 00946 376 139 2 4
"Frontline 3 track promo cd" inc edit (will be rare as not circulated) CDEMDJ 708 CAT NO 00946 375 508 2 3
"Frontline 7" White Label EM708
"Frontline DFA 12" white label very rare 12EMDJ 708
"Frontline Cd:" includes Clear Cut CDEM 708 CAT NO 00946 380 3072 0
"Frontline gatefold 7inch (1)" includes Evolutions EM 708 CAT NO 00946 375 508 7 8
"Frontline 7" (2)" includes These Words EMX 708 CAT NO 00946 381 183 7 4
"Frontline DFA Remix 12" 500 made 12 EM 708

"Animal"
"Animal" EMDJ 742 LTD 99 copies of a 1 sided 12" vinyl
"Animal" EMI CDR

"Keep An Open Mind"
"Keep An Open Mind" EMI CDEMDJ746  2 Track Promo CD includes edit and Instrumental 
"Keep An Open Mind" EMI CDEM746 CD  includes Keep An Open Mind fade & Bakersfield  from the Distraction sessions
"Keep An Open Mind" EMI EM746  Vinyl 1 Includes Keep An Open Mind Edit &  Satellites Ltd gatefold black vinyl
"Keep An Open Mind" EMI EMX746 Vinyl 2  includes Keep An Open Mind album version & Patience Ltd red vinyl 
"Keep An Open Mind" Alternate Version exclusive version for iTunes
"Keep An Open Mind" Live Exclusive version for Record Store

Debuted at #53 on the UK Charts. There are 3 different versions of the cover, designed by Bogna Kuczerawy.

"Echoes of Fashion"
"Echoes Of Fashion" EMI CDEMDJ 751  2 Track Promo CD includes edit and Instrumental 
"Little Echoes Of Fashion" Rich Haines Dungeon session recording
"LEOF" Mario's Computer demo version

Compilations
"In The city 2005 cd"
"Camden Crawl 2006 cd" (Frontline)
"Bands 06 cd" (Broke) (emi)
"Ibiza Rocks 2006 cd" (inc Broke)

Non album tracks
"Kennedy" Produced by Rob Kirwan (re- recorded bass and drums and mix)
"Why Wait" Produced by Rob Kirwan b-side "Broke"
"Falling Down The Stairs" Produced by Rob Kirwan b-side "Broke"
"Spring Park Hotel" recorded by Tim Weidner b-side "Glorious"
"An Evening Light" recorded by Tim Weidner b-side "Glorious"
"Positivity" recorded by Tim Weidner b-side "Glorious"
"Evolutions" recorded by Captain engineered by Ian b-side "Frontline"
"Clear Cut" recorded by Captain engineered by Ian b-side "Frontline"
"These Words" Unfaded version recorded by Captain engineered by Ian b-side "Frontline"
 "Wax Live at Bush Hall" Produced by JJ Stereo mixed by Paddy free Myspace download
"Accdie Live at Bush Hall" Produced by JJ Stereo mixed by Paddy free Myspace download
"Frontline" Produced by Rob Kirwan (released on At Large Recordings)
"This Heart Keeps Beating For Me" Produced by Rob Kirwan (released on At Large Recordings)
"Broke Demo" Produced by Rob Kirwan iTunes download
"Broke Instrumental" Produced By Trevor Horn from the Broke Promo CD
"Glorious Radioslave Remix" remixed by Radioslave (Matt Edwards) b-side Glorious (CD 2)
"Glorious Cut And Shut version" Produced by Captain iTunes download
"Glorious live at Bush Hall" Produced by Paul for JJ Stereo iTunes download
"Glorious Demo" Produced by Rob Kirwan recorded at Rockfield Studios version 2 iTunes download
"Glorious Edit" Produced By Trevor Horn from the Glorious Promo CD and iTunes
"Glorious Instrumental" Produced By Trevor Horn from the Glorious Promo CD
"Frontline DFA Remix" Frontline 12" remixed by the DFA
"Frontline Demo" Produced by Rob Kirwan iTunes download
"Frontline Cut And Shut version" Produced by Captain iTunes download
"Frontline Instrumental" Produced By Trevor Horn from the Frontline Promo CD
"Bakersfield" Produced By Barny Barnicott from The Keep An Open Mind CD a track not making the second album
"Satellites" recorded for original release of Keep An Open Mind produced by Ben Hillier (not additional Production from Barny) Keep An Open Mind On vinyl 1
"Patience" Recorded By Rob Kirwan as an early demo for the band before they signed... never made either album. on Keep An Open Mind On vinyl 2

Unreleased
"Frontline DFA Remix instrumental" Frontline 12" remixed by the DFA Unreleased
"Frontline Edit" rare un-issued 3 track promo cd
"These Words" faded version recorded by Captain engineered by Ian unreleased
"Glorious" 50 Eddies Remix Unreleased
"Glorious" 50 Eddies Remix 2 Unreleased
"Animal" Optimo Remix Unreleased

Discographies of British artists
Rock music group discographies